Mballo Baba Keita (born 15 November 1987) is a Senegalese footballer, who currently plays for Al-Arabi in the Qatar Stars League as a defender. Baba Keita was born on November 15, 1987. He lived with his family for a while until he moved to Qatar and started playing for teams like, Al-Arabi and Al-Khor.

Notes

1987 births
Living people
Senegalese footballers
Al-Sailiya SC players
Al-Wakrah SC players
Al-Arabi SC (Qatar) players
Muaither SC players
Umm Salal SC players
Al-Khor SC players
Qatar Stars League players
Association football defenders